Aka'aka is a village in Wallis and Futuna.  It is located in Hahake District on Wallis Island. Its population according to the 2018 census was 474 people.

References

Populated places in Wallis and Futuna